Seixas ( or ) is a common Galician and Portuguese surname. It may refer to:
 Carlos Seixas – Portuguese composer of the 18th century
 Gershom Mendes Seixas – minister of Congregation Shearith Israel
 Francisco Seixas da Costa – Portuguese diplomat and former politician
 Vic Seixas (born 1923) – American top-10 tennis player
 Raul Seixas – Brazilian rock musician
 Alberto Seixas Santos – Portuguese film director
 Ponta do Seixas – easternmost point of South America

Surnames
Portuguese-language surnames